Live in Rio is a 2-disc live album by Australian singer songwriter James Reyne. The album was recorded live in Circo Voador, Rio de Janeiro, Brazil in May 1995.

Review
Tomas Mureika of All Music said "Presenting the master playing at the top of his game, this two-CD live hits set includes tracks from James Reyne's Australian Crawl days as well as from his lucrative solo career. He fronts a tight band and does a dynamic job capturing the feel of one of his live shows. Most surprising are the standout tracks "Harvest Moon" "Slave" and "Winds of Change"... which really carry a punch live." adding "All in all an impressive live album from one of Australia's greatest superstars".

Track listing
CD1
 "Things Don't Seem" (Guy McDonough, Sean Higgins)
 "Lakeside" (Reyne)
 "Harvest Moon" (Reyne, Simon Hussey)
 "Slave" (Reyne, Jim Vallance)
 "Five Miles Closer To The Sun" (Reyne, Hussey)
 "Winds Of Change" (Brett Goldsmith, Reyne)
 "Hammerhead" (Reyne, Hussey)
 "Daughters Of The Northern Coast" (McDonough, Reyne)
 "One More River" (Reyne)
 CD2
 "Unpublished Critics" (Reyne, Williams)
 "Motor's Too Fast" (Reyne, Hussey)
 "Some People" (Reyne, Vallance)
 "Oh No Not You Again" (McDonough)
 "The Traveller" (Davitt Sigerson, Reyne, Scott)
 "Errol" (McDonough, Reyne)
 "Reckless" (Reyne)
 "Day In The Sun" (Reyne)
 "The Boys Light Up" (Reyne)

Credits
 Bass, Backing Vocals – Ron Francois
 Drums – John Watson
 Guitar, Backing Vocals – Michael King
 Keyboards, Backing Vocals – Mark O'Connor
 Keyboards, Guitar, Backing Vocals – Andrew Bett
 Vocals, Guitar – James Reyne

Charts

Release history

References

James Reyne albums
1996 live albums
Live albums by Australian artists